Tribonian (Greek: Τριβωνιανός [trivonia'nos], c. 485?–542) was a notable Byzantine jurist and advisor, who during the reign of the Emperor Justinian I, supervised the revision of the legal code of the Byzantine Empire. He has been described as one of the wisest collaborators of Emperor Justinian.

Biography 
Tribonian was a Greek, born in Side, in Pamphylia, around the year 500. He was well educated and practiced law before the court of the praetorian prefect. Justinian made Tribonian magister officiorum (Master of Offices), although it is not clear when, and then appointed him quaestor sacri palatii in September 529.

In 528, before he was appointed quaestor, Tribonian was named by Justinian as one of the commissioners charged with preparing the new imperial legal code, the Codex Justinianeus, which subsequently was issued on April 7, 529. In 530, after Tribonian had become quaestor, it was natural for Justinian to put him in charge of the next major law reform project: compiling and harmonizing the writings of classical Roman jurists. Justinian's main objects in creating this harmonized compilation of juristic writings were to shorten litigation (by clarifying the law), and to create a syllabus to be used at the law schools in Berytus (Beirut) and Constantinople. During the same period, Tribonian also was charged with carrying out another aspect of Justinian's reforms in legal education and codification — creating a textbook for first-year law students by updating the Institutes of Gaius. Both the Digest and the new Institutes of Justinian were promulgated in December of 533. In 534, Justinian decided that so many new laws had been passed, and so many older ones harmonized, since the publication of his first Code in 529, a second edition was needed. Hence, the Codex repetitae praelectionis was published, entirely superseding the edition of 529, the text of which has been lost. 

In 532, Tribonian was removed as quaestor due to the charges made by his enemies during the Nika riots, but he continued to work on the codification. He was restored to his post as quaestor in 535 and continued in that position until his death. Tribonian continued to help draft new laws for Justinian; these new laws (Novellae Constitutiones) were later combined with the Codex Justinianus, the Digest and the Institutes to comprise the Corpus Juris Civilis.

Tribonian died in 542 of a disease, perhaps the plague. Tribonian's career is summarized by his noted modern biographer, Tony Honoré, in this way: "...he was Justinian's minister for legislation and propaganda for nearly twelve years...In these years the three volumes of the Corpus Juris Civilis and most of the surviving legislation of Justinian's reign were produced. He drafted about three-quarters of the surviving constitutions of Justinian's reign. He planned and directed the work of the Second Law Commission, which produced the Digest, the Institutes and the Second "Codex Iustinianus."

References 

500 births
542 deaths
6th-century Byzantine people
Ancient Roman jurists
Byzantine jurists
Magistri officiorum
Ministers of Justinian I
6th-century Byzantine writers
6th-century Latin writers
6th-century jurists